Route 146 is a highway in northern Missouri.  Its eastern terminus is at Route 6 west of Trenton; its western terminus is at U.S. Route 136 east of Bethany.

Major intersections

References

146
Transportation in Harrison County, Missouri
Transportation in Grundy County, Missouri